Lake Uljaste (Estonian: Uljaste Järv, Uljastjärv, or Suur Uljaste järv, Russian: Ульясте) is a lake of Estonia near the village of Uljaste, Ida-Viru county.

Gallery

See also
List of lakes of Estonia

Uljaste
Lüganuse Parish
Uljaste